Rocky Point is a residential locality in the Weipa Town, Queensland, Australia. In the  Rocky Point had a population of 1,957 people.

Geography 
Over half of the land in Rocky Point is used for residential housing with the remainder undeveloped.

History
Weipa North State School opened on 14 March 1966. On 1 January 2002 it became the Weipa campus of the Western Cape College.

In the  Rocky Point had a population of 1,957 people.

Amenities 
The Weipa Town Authority provides the Hibberd Library in Hibberd Drive.

St Joseph's Catholic Church is on Boundary Road at Rocky Point. It is within the Weipa Parish of the Roman Catholic Diocese of Cairns.

Education 

Western Cape College is a government primary and secondary (Early Childhood-12) school for boys and girls. Its Weipa Campus is at Central Avenue. In 2017, the school had an enrolment of 958 students with 88 teachers (85 full-time equivalent) and 76 non-teaching staff (62 full-time equivalent). It includes a special education program. It offers boarding facilities at Lot 50 Tamarind Road.

References 

Weipa Town
Coastline of Queensland
Localities in Queensland